Weirdsister College is the sequel to successful British children's television series The Worst Witch (1998–2001), based on The Worst Witch books by Jill Murphy. Weirdsister College aired on ITV from 28 November to 14 December 2001.

Production
Before the release of Season 3 The Worst Witch the creators of the show realized that the actresses in the show were getting older and that making a potential fourth season after season 3 would be difficult. So instead, the creators were hired to create a sequel show to The Worst Witch which began development in early 2001.

The show was cancelled in 2002.

Plot
The show follows Mildred Hubble (Georgina Sherrington) in her first year at Weirdsister College, a university for students of magic. In a similar way to her adventures at Cackle's Academy, Mildred usually messes up, but saves the day in the end. The series has a darker tone than The Worst Witch, with evil creatures and a possible doomsday.

The College
Weirdsister College in Cambridge is an institution where successful students from magical academies and institutes of Great Britain can further their magical education, and where qualified doctors and professors can teach and (along with the students) push the boundaries of magic with experiments. The college has many age-old traditions and legends, such as 'The Agonies' the games held once a year, the prize is possession of The Golden Cauldron, a highly magical artefact, but the winner can only have it for one night.

Nearby, and owned by the College, is Misery's cafe. This is the local hangout for the main characters, and is also the site of Jazz concerts (in which one character, Thunderblast, plays the trombone). Some students had saved the cafe from closure by 'meddling' with time. Also in the town is Jenny Wendle's studio, where meditation classes are held.

The College is a highly magical building, and with so many spells and magical demonstrations being performed, the Foster's effect would destroy the building, so The Bus Spell covers the building and its grounds. This means that every Friday the college has no magic performed in it, or strange events may happen and chaos will rule.

Characters and cast

The Staff

Professor Alicia Thunderblast (Charmian May) –  the director  of the College. Experienced witch, trombone player and almost as partial to cakes as Miss Cackle.
Dr.Claire  Wendle (Jaye Griffiths) – An experienced first year tutor, and Millie's mentor. Runs the Witches Practice in town and her knowledge is needed to help save the College.
Dr. Andy Starfinder (Eric Loren) – An American wizard who looks to broaden the boundaries of magic with science and his inventions. Got himself into trouble with Dewdrop on his 2nd day, by performing magic on a Friday which broke the Bus Spell.
Professor Johnathan Shakeshaft (John Rogan) – The oldest member of staff, teaches (and forgets) various types of magic but spends most of his time asleep. Rumours about him are that he is mad and that he is from medieval times.
Rose Dewdrop (Jenny Galloway) –  The College's Beadle, Bursar, Doorkeeper and Mistress of Discipline, she takes care of the Foster's Effect and upholds the rules and regulations of the College, regularly fining the students.

Students

Mildred Hubble (Georgina Sherrington) – The main character of The Worst Witch. In this series, based on her artistic skills Millie gained a scholarship to the college. She appears at the college unchanged, until the end of the first episode she cuts off her trademark plaits after being cheated on by Nick Hobbes and Cas remarked them as being childlike.
Ethel Hallow (Felicity Jones) – Ethel is Millie's old nemesis from Cackle's. Upon their first encounter (where they are forced to share a room together) their mutual loathing resurfaces and Ethel claims that Mildred has no right to be in the college. However they become friends except in one episode where Ethel believes Mildred is trying to muscle in on her experimental team for which Doctor Starfinder chose her personally. Mildred states, however, that she "didn't ask to be his guinea pig". Ethel and Hobbes also nearly tear Millie and Ben apart when they imprison Mildred in the Experimental Magic Laboratory and put Ben in mortal danger. The only way for Mildred to save him was to get inside his head and use his voice to remove the Locking Spell that Hobbes had put on the door to maze he had placed miniature Ben and a very large rat into. Ethel returns with a brand new look but the same attitude.
Deirdre "Dee" Swoop (Stephanie Lane) – A graduate of Pentangle's Academy, more chilled out in this series but loves a spot of jazz (even donning a trilby hat) and taking part in the annual games.
Cas Crowfeather (Abeille Gélinas) – Millie's new best friend, hailing all the way from Canada to attend Weirdsister. She "replaces" Maud Moonshine who does not appear in the series.
Nicholas "Nick" Hobbes (Bobby Barry) – Dark and secretive wizard, not liked by most of the students and has a megalomaniac side to him, it is also often suggested that he has feelings for Mildred.
Azmat Madari (Sacha Dhawan) – Wizard, best friend of Tim, comes from Clitheroe, Lancashire.
Tim Wraithewight (Kent Riley) – Wizard, comes from Bootle near Liverpool and best friend of Azmat.

Minor characters
Ben Stemson (Christian Coulson) – Non-magical worker of Misery's (ran by his mother) and very good friend of Mildred (boyfriend from episode 6). Although Mildred's witchiness almost ruined their blossoming relationship, he put the feelings aside and even helped use his scientific knowledge to save Weirdsister.
Elaine Stemson (Heather Wright) – Owner of Misery's, is into New Age Magic and loves her son a lot. She was very troubled when Dewdrop threatened to close Misery's.
Miss Hardbroom (Kate Duchêne) – Summoned by magic to test Mildred, to see if she was strong enough to enter Weirdsister as a student. Mildred passed and Miss Hardbroom wished her luck and smiled before returning to Cackle's.
Enid Nightshade (Jessica Fox) – Spent two days at Weirdsister after running away from Primrose Hill (another magic university) to see Millie. Her presence and rebellious behaviour causes tension between Mildred, Cas and Ethel. Enid leaves after revealing that she hated Primrose Hill because she never managed to fit in with the other students, and was expelled for being a bad student and "over-partying".

Episodes

Cancellation
There were many factors in the cancellation of Weirdsister College, The first season's expenses overinflated due to the expensive cost of filming at Cambridge University. Secondly, Weirdsister College didn't receive enough popularity and viewership for a second season, partly due to the fact that many of the original viewers of The Worst Witch (1998 TV series) had lost interest or were too old for the series. The third reason for its cancellation was due to its mixed reviews, many of them having an approval rating of less than 45%. Therefore the show was canceled quietly in January 2002.

DVD release
In 2007, Shock released Weirdsister College on DVD, in a boxset with Series 3 of The Worst Witch, although it is titled as "Series 4" of The Worst Witch. Shock also released box sets of Series 1 & 2 of The Worst Witch, and Series 1 & 2 of The New Worst Witch. These are released only in Australia, but are playable worldwide.

Via Vision announced it will be releasing a standalone DVD boxset titled, The Worst Witch: Weirdsister College - The Complete Series. Once again, this release will only be in Australia, but will be playable worldwide.

References

External links

Weirdsister College Source

British children's fantasy television series
Fictional colleges of the University of Cambridge
The Worst Witch
ITV children's television shows
English-language television shows
2000s British children's television series
2001 British television series debuts
2002 British television series endings
Witchcraft in television
Wizards in television
Television series about teenagers
Television about magic
Sequel television series
Television shows set in Cambridgeshire
British college television series